Campeonato Mineiro is the state football league of the state of Minas Gerais and is controlled by the Minas Gerais Football Federation FMF (Federação Mineira de Futebol).

The history of Campeonato Mineiro can be divided into two parts: before and after the construction of the Mineirão, in September 1966. The Mineirão is the biggest football stadium of Minas Gerais and it is located in Minas Gerais' state capital, Belo Horizonte. Before the stadium's inauguration América and Atlético were the most successful teams in the state, but after the construction of the Mineirão, known as the "Era Mineirão" ("Mineirão Era"), another team from the capital, Cruzeiro, also gained prominence. Atlético is the most successful team in the competition, having won 47 championships as of 2022, trailed by Cruzeiro with 40 championships.

As with many other Brazilian football state leagues, the Campeonato Mineiro is much older than the Brazilian League itself. This is partly because in the early 20th century Brazil did not have a well established transportation and communication infrastructure, that could help it organize a national league in the country, which was made worse by the nation's enormous size.

Many of the best players in Brazilian football were first seen in the Campeonato Mineiro, players like Reinaldo, Cerezo, Éder, Ronaldo, Dario and Tostão had their professional football debut in the competition.

List of champions

Supercampeonato Mineiro

In 2002 was organized the Super Championship with the 4 teams in the 2002 Copa Sul-Minas (Cruzeiro, América, Atlético and Mamoré) and the 2002 Mineiro Champions (Caldense).

Titles by team 

Teams in bold still active.

RSSSF

Note: Although Cruzeiro considers itself champions of the Campeonato Mineiro in 1926, officially the Atlético Mineiro is the only official champion of this competition. Making officially Cruzeiro have 39 Campeonatos Mineiros.

By city

Participation

Most appearances

Below is the list of clubs that have more appearances in the Campeonato Mineiro.

Do not includes 1926 AMET championship.
Includes 2002 Supercampeonato Mineiro.
Tupi includes the participation of "Corporativa Manchester" (1995), when club merged with Sport Juiz de Fora and Tupynambás.

Current clubs

First Division 2022 (Módulo I da Primeira Divisão)

América (Belo Horizonte)
Athletic Club (São João del-Rei)
Atlético (Belo Horizonte)
Caldense (Poços de Caldas)
Cruzeiro (Belo Horizonte)
Democrata (Governador Valadares)
Patrocinense (Patrocínio)
Pouso Alegre (Pouso Alegre)
Tombense (Tombos)
Uberlândia (Uberlândia)
URT (Patos de Minas)
Villa Nova (Nova Lima)

Second Division 2022 (Módulo II da Primeira Divisão)

Aymorés (Ubá)
Betim Futebol (Betim)
Boa Esporte (Varginha)
Coimbra (Contagem)
Democrata (Sete Lagoas)
Ipatinga (Ipatinga)
Nacional AC (Muriaé)
Tupi (Juiz de Fora)
Tupynambás (Juiz de Fora)
Uberaba (Uberaba)
União Luziense (Santa Luzia)
Varginha (Varginha)

See also
Campeonato Mineiro Modulo II
Campeonato Mineiro Segunda Divisão

External links
FMF Official Website
Campeões do Futebol
 Julio Bovi Diogo: Minas Gerais State – List of Champions RSSSF Brasil, July 24, 2012.

 
Football competitions in Minas Gerais
Mineiro